Ministry of Finance is the central authority of Government of Nepal charged with the responsibilities for maintaining both micro and macro economic stability in the country. The position of finance minister in Nepal is currently held by Bishnu Prasad Paudel since 26 December 2022.

History
The predecessor of the Ministry of Finance of Nepal, the Ministry of Economic and Planning was established in 1963. In 1968, this Ministry was dissolved and the Ministry of Finance as well as the National Planning Commission of Nepal were set up. Ever since, the Ministry was the highest financial authority of Nepal.

Mandate
The mandate of the ministry includes the following: Formulation, implementation, monitoring and evaluation of economic and revenue policy, financial administration and control of plans and programs, Financial analysis, Currency, determination and implementation of monetary policy.
Also it is responsible for the Central Bank of Nepal, Nepal Rastra Bank (Including Nepal Industrial Development Corporation) and co-ordination with the World Bank, the International Monetary Fund, the Asian Development Bank and other International Financial Institutions.

Structure and departments
The Ministry is divided into several divisions:
 Revenue Advisory Committee
 International Economic Cooperation Co-ordination Division
 Budget and Programme Division
 Corporation Co-ordination and Privatisation Division
 Revenue Administration Division
 Economic Affairs and Policy Analysis Division
 Administrative Division
 Legal Division
 Monitoring and Evaluation Division

The Ministry of Finance furthermore consists of the following six Departments:
 Office of the Financial Comptroller General - the main government agency responsible for the treasury operation of the Government of Nepal
 Department of Customs
 Inland Revenue Department
 Department of Revenue Investigation
 Revenue Administration Training Center
 Department of Money Laundering Investigation

Former Finance Ministers of the Kingdom of Nepal
This s a list of all former Finance Ministers of the Kingdom of Nepal and their appointments until 2008:
 Subarna Shamsher Rana, February 1951
 Kaiser Shumsher Jang Bahadur Rana, 1952
 Matrika Prasad Koirala, June 1953
 S. Gunjaman Singh, January 1957
 C. B. Singh, July 1957
 Subarna Shamsher Rana, May 1958
 Rishikesh Shah, December 1960
 Surya Bahadur Thapa, July 1962
 Surendra Bahadur Basnet, September 1968
 Kirti Nidhi Bista, April 1969
 Gehendra Bahadur Rajbhandari, April 1970
 Kirti Nidhi Bista, April 1971
 Bhekh Bahadur Thapa, July 1973
 Ram Prasad Rajbahak, April 1979
 Surya Bahadur Thapa, May 1979
 Yadav Pant, June 1980
 Prakash Chandra Lohani, July 1983
 Bharat Bahadur Thapa, March 1986
 Pashupati Shamsher Jang Bahadur Rana, April 1990
 Devendra Raj Pandey, April 1990
 Girija Prasad Koirala, May 1991
 Mahesh Acharya, December 1991
 Bharat Mohan Adhikari, November 1994
 Ram Saran Mahat, September 1995
 Rabindra Nath Sharma, March 1997
 Ram Saran Mahat, April 1998
 Bharat Mohan Adhikari, December 1998
 Mahesh Acharya, May 1999
 Ram Saran Mahat, July 2001
 Badri Prasad Shrestha, October 2003
 Prakash Chandra Lohani, June 2003
 Bharat Mohan Adhikari, June 2004
 Madhukar Shamsher Rana, February 2005

Former Finance Ministers during the transition phase of Nepal
This is a list of former Finance Ministers of the Nepal during its transition phase (2008 - 2013):

Former and current Finance Ministers since 2013
This is a list of all former Finance Ministers since the Nepalese Constituent Assembly election in 2013:

Key
 - Current Finance Minister

Notes

References

External links
Official website

Finance
Nepal
Government finances in Nepal